Solomon Pucher (1829 – 23 November 1899) was an Imperial Russian religious leader, who served as rabbi of Mitau and Riga.

Biography
Solomon Pucher was born in 1829 in Neustadt-Schirwindt, Russian Poland. At the age of thirteen he was send to study at the yeshiva of Georgenburg, during which time he became acquainted with Maskilic literature and began to learn German. He afterwards attended the Vilna Rabbinical School, and was called in 1859 to the rabbinate of Mitau. As a rabbi Pucher received from the government the silver and the gold medal of merit.

In the 1860s he publicly opposed the Christian mission to Jews in Courland in speeches and in written articles. He fought to obtain civil and political rights for the Jews, and in 1864 he was called to Saint Petersburg as a member of the commission for securing the right of residence to Jewish workers. About twenty years later he wrote and presented to Count Pahlen, chairman of the Jewish commission, who was staying in Courland, a detailed memorandum on the condition of the Jews. 

Within the Jewish community, Pucher labored for the religious education of girls, establishing confirmation classes for them. The first girl's confirmation (a precursor to the modern bat mitzvah) in Courland was held in 1861 under his supervision. He also gave boys free religious instruction in the gymnasium, and founded in 1862 the Klub jüdischer Intellektueller (Jewish Intellectuals' Club).

In 1893 he accepted a call as rabbi to Riga, where he worked until 1898, when he retired from public life. The community at Riga raised a large fund in his honour, the interest of which was used for the benefit of widows and orphans.

Partial bibliography

References
 

1829 births
1899 deaths
19th-century Latvian Jews
19th-century Lithuanian rabbis
19th-century rabbis from the Russian Empire
Clergy from Riga
Latvian rabbis
People from Kudirkos Naumiestis
Vilna Rabbinical School alumni